Geraldine Cowper (born 23 June 1958) is an English actress who is best known for playing Rowan Morrison in the 1973 horror film The Wicker Man and Rosie Miller in EastEnders. In the mid-1980s she took the part of Clare France in After Henry on BBC radio and also appeared on television as Jim Hacker's daughter in Yes Minister.

Career
Cowper was Clare France, the youngest of the female triumvirate in the BBC Radio 4 comedy After Henry, which also starred Prunella Scales and Joan Sanderson. Whilst Scales and Sanderson reprised their roles in the later television version, Cowper was considered too old to play a teenager on screen and the role went to Janine Wood.

Cowper also played Lucy Hacker, the daughter of Jim Hacker, in the BBC comedy series Yes Minister, although only in one episode. She featured in two episodes of Only Fools and Horses – "Tea for Three" and "The Frog's Legacy" – as Trigger's niece Lisa, and also appeared in Bachelor Father. In her early teens, Cowper made an uncredited appearance in Alfred Hitchcock's Frenzy (1972) and played Rowan Morrison in the horror film The Wicker Man (1973).

Just as David Spinx, her on-screen EastEnders partner, had small roles in the series prior to playing Keith Miller, Cowper had briefly played Lindsay, the mother of a schizophrenic youth named Matt, in April 2002. She appeared in an episode of Law & Order: UK in 2014 as Hope Corday.

TV and filmography

Law & Order: UK ... Hope Corday; 2014, ITV
EastEnders ... Rosie Miller; 2004–2006, BBC One
Casualty ... Eileen Price in "Feuds and Fury"; 14 December 2002, BBC One
EastEnders ... Matt Lindsay's Mother (Anne Lindsay) in two episodes; 23–25 April 2002, BBC One
The Bill ... Jane Foster in "Meltdown: Part 1"; 6 March 2000, ITV
Trial & Retribution ... Ann Taylor; 19 October 1997
The Bill ... D.I.O. in "Repossession"; 6 September 1996, ITV
The Bill ... Lorraine Dent in "Partners"; 23 August 1994, ITV
The Bill ... May Kilby in "Desperate Remedies"; 31 August 1993, ITV
The Bill ... Brenda Knight in "Blue for a Boy"; 6 October 1988, ITV
Only Fools and Horses ... Lisa in "The Frog's Legacy"; 25 December 1987, BBC1
Only Fools and Horses ... Lisa in "Tea for Three"; 21 September 1986, BBC1
The Return of the Soldier (1982) ... Ward Nurse
S.W.A.L.K. ... Katherine; 1982–1984, Channel 4
Yes Minister ... Lucy Hacker in "The Right to Know"; 31 March 1980, BBC1
Little Lord Fauntleroy (1980) ... Mellon
Enemy at the Door ... Jenny Glover in "From a View to a Death"; 15 March 1980
Two People... Christine (6 episodes) November/December 1979
Telford's Change ... Jenny Ball in three episodes; 7–21 January 1979
Dick Turpin ... Lucy in "The Champion"; 20 January 1979
General Hospital (1977) ... Lynn Tyson
Double Echo (1976) ... Alison Fisher
The Wicker Man (1973) ... Rowan Morrison
Frenzy (1972) ... Spectator
Bachelor Father (1970) ... Jo

Personal life
Cowper is the older sister of actress Nicola Cowper and the twin sister of the late Jackie Cowper, who was also an actress.

References

External links
 

1958 births
Living people
English soap opera actresses
English television actresses
Actresses from London